Taura Danang Sudiro or better known as Tora Sudiro (born in Jakarta, Indonesia on 10 May 1973) is an Indonesian actor and comedian of Javanese descent.

Personal life
After his divorce, Tora married Mieke Amalia in 2009 with both having two children each from previous marriages. In 2012, they had a daughter.

Filmography

Film

TV series

Variety show

Model video clips

Awards and nominations

References

External links
 

1973 births
Indonesian male comedians
Indonesian comedians
Indonesian male film actors
Indonesian male television actors
Javanese people
Living people
People from Jakarta
20th-century Indonesian male actors